Charles Gustavus Ulrich Dahlgren (August 13, 1811 – December 18, 1888) was a brigadier general of Mississippi State Troops (or Mississippi Militia) with allegiance to the Confederate States of America during the American Civil War. He commanded the 3rd Brigade of the Mississippi Militia, before a dispute with the President of the Confederate States of America, Jefferson Davis, over transfer of the state troops to the Confederate States Army cost him his career.

Early life and career
Dahlgren was born in Philadelphia, Pennsylvania, the son of Bernhard Ulrik Dahlgren (1784-1824) and Martha (Rowan) Dahlgren (1789-1838). His father was a  merchant and Swedish Consul stationed in Philadelphia. He briefly served in the United States Navy. His older brother was John A. Dahlgren, an admiral in the Union Navy. He moved to Louisiana, then to Mississippi, as a young man. He was an official of the Bank of the United States at Natchez, Mississippi, and engaged in several other business ventures.

Civil War service
Following Mississippi's passage of the ordinance of secession and the subsequent outbreak of the Civil War, Dahlgren raised two regiments of state-sponsored volunteer infantry (the 3rd and 7th Mississippi Infantry Regiments) by his own means. When his brigade (Brigade 3) was transferred from state service to the Provisional Army of the Confederate States, he lost his command. Dahlgren was known for a short temper and strong opinions, and strongly opposed this transfer. His outspoken opposition to the nationalization of his men cost him his command and sparked a feud with the family of Jefferson Davis that spanned from 1862 to 1906.

Later life 

After the Civil War, Dahlgren had lost his plantation and fortune and moved to New Orleans to practice law. Thereafter, he moved with his family to Nashville, Tennessee, for several months in 1870, then to Winchester, Virginia, and finally to New York City in 1876, where he worked as a lawyer and public accountant. He died at Brooklyn, New York, on December 18, 1888, and was buried in the City Cemetery, Natchez, Mississippi.

See also

List of American Civil War generals (Acting Confederate)

Notes

References
 Allardice, Bruce S. More Generals in Gray. Baton Rouge: Louisiana State University Press, 1995. .
 Eicher, John H., and David J. Eicher, Civil War High Commands. Stanford: Stanford University Press, 2001. .
 Gower, Herschel, Charles Dahlgren of Natchez: The Civil War and Dynastic Decline, Brassey's, Inc., 2002, .
 Marell, Oscar G.  Sweden-America (Swedish Chamber of Commerce of the United States of America, 1918.

1811 births
1888 deaths
Military personnel from Philadelphia
American people of Swedish descent
Confederate militia generals
People of Mississippi in the American Civil War
Northern-born Confederates